Specialized Seaport Olivia (until 2017 - Specialized Seaport Oktyabrsk) is a seaport located on the left bank of the Bug Estuary 25 km from Mykolaiv. According to the Law of Ukraine "On Seaports of Ukraine," the functions of the seaport administration are performed by the Olvia branch of the state enterprise of the Ukrainian Sea Ports Authority.

See also

List of ports in Ukraine
Transport in Ukraine

References

Ports of Mykolaiv
Companies established in 1965
Buildings and structures in Mykolaiv Oblast
Ukrainian Sea Ports Authority